Oryctorhynchus is an extinct genus of rhynchosaur from the Late Triassic (Carnian-Norian)-aged Wolfville Formation of Nova Scotia, Canada. The type species, O. bairdi, was named and described in 2020. It was originally seen as a species of Hyperodapedon until 2020.

Discovery and naming 
The holotype was discovered in the Wolfville Formation; its earliest known mention is by Baird (1963). Shortly after, it was informally named the "Nova Scotia Hyperodapedon" (H. sp.) by Robin Whatley. It was briefly described by Michael Benton (1983) also as a species of Hyperodapedon. The genus was not recognised as a distinct taxon until it was named in 2020.

The holotype, NSM018GFF009.003, consists of a partial jaw and several skull fragments including the rostrum and skull roof.

Etymology
The genus name consists of the orycto prefix, which means burrow, and the rhynchus suffix, meaning snout; the full genus name means burrowed snout. The epithet honours David Baird, for his work on Triassic tetrapods from Nova Scotia.

Classification 

Sues et al. (2020) placed Oryctorhynchus as the sister species to Hyperodapedon and an unnamed hyperodapedontine taxon from Wyoming.

Paleoecology 

Ornithorhynchus is from the Wolfville Formation (Upper Wolfville Member; Fundy Basin), which probably corresponds to the Popo Agie Formation. The age of the Upper Wolfville Member is unclear; it either dates from the latest Carnian? - earliest Norian? or the late Carnian (~230 Ma).

It would have coexisted with Acadiella, Arctotraversodon, Arctosuchus buceros (?), Haligonia, Scoloparia and Teraterpeton.

References 

Paleontology in Nova Scotia
Triassic Canada
Fossils of Canada
Rhynchosaurs
Late Triassic reptiles of North America
Carnian genera
Norian genera
Fossil taxa described in 2020
Prehistoric reptile genera